Acoustic theory is a scientific field that relates to the description of sound waves. It derives from fluid dynamics. See acoustics for the engineering approach.

For sound waves of any magnitude of a disturbance in velocity, pressure, and density we have
 

In the case that the fluctuations in velocity, density, and pressure are small, we can approximate these as
 

In the case that the velocity is irrotational, we then have the acoustic wave equation that describes the system:

Where we have

Derivation for a medium at rest
Starting with the Continuity Equation and the Euler Equation:
 

If we  take small perturbations of a constant pressure and density:
 

Then the equations of the system are
 

Noting that the equilibrium pressures and densities are constant, this simplifies to

A Moving Medium
Starting with
 

In this case the equations look very similar:
 

Note that setting  returns the equations at rest.

Linearized Waves
Starting with the above given equations of motion for a medium at rest:
 

Let us now take  to all be small quantities.

In the case that we keep terms to first order, for the continuity equation, we have the  term going to 0. This similarly applies for the density perturbation times the time derivative of the velocity. Moreover, the spatial components of the material derivative go to 0. We thus have, upon rearranging the equilibrium density:
 

Next, given that our sound wave occurs in an ideal fluid, the motion is adiabatic, and then we can relate the small change in the pressure to the small change in the density by
 

Under this condition, we see that we now have
 

Defining the speed of sound of the system:
 

Everything becomes

For Irrotational Fluids
 

The second equation tells us that
 

And the use of this equation in the continuity equation tells us that
 

This simplifies to
 

Thus the velocity potential  obeys the wave equation in the limit of small disturbances. The boundary conditions required to solve for the potential come from the fact that the velocity of the fluid must be 0 normal to the fixed surfaces of the system.

Taking the time derivative of this wave equation and multiplying all sides by the unperturbed density, and then using the fact that  tells us that
 

Similarly, we saw that . Thus we can multiply the above equation appropriately and see that
 

Thus, the velocity potential, pressure, and density all obey the wave equation. Moreover, we only need to solve one such equation to determine all other three. In particular, we have

For a moving medium
Again, we can derive the small-disturbance limit for sound waves in a moving medium. Again, starting with
 

We can linearize these into

For Irrotational Fluids in a Moving Medium
Given that we saw that
 

If we make the previous assumptions of the fluid being ideal and the velocity being irrotational, then we have
 

Under these assumptions, our linearized sound equations become
 

Importantly, since  is a constant, we have , and then the second equation tells us that
 

Or just that
 

Now, when we use this relation with the fact that , alongside cancelling and rearranging terms, we arrive at
 

We can write this in a familiar form as

This differential equation must be solved with the appropriate boundary conditions. Note that setting  returns us the wave equation. Regardless, upon solving this equation for a moving medium, we then have

See also
 Acoustic attenuation
 Sound
 Fourier analysis

References
 
 

Fluid dynamics
Acoustics
Sound